The 2010–11 Bahrain First Division League is the 54th edition of top-level football in Bahrain. Al-Ahli (Manama) were the defending champions. The winner of the league was Al-Muharraq SC

Teams
East Riffa Club were relegated to the second level after finishing the 2009–10 season in the bottom place. They were replaced by Al Hidd of Muharraq.

The league was heavily disrupted by the Bahraini uprising in February and a number of games were cancelled or awarded to the opposition team. As it became clear that the league would struggle to continue with the number of postponements, it appeared that Al-Shabab and Malkiya either withdrew from the championship or suspended from the championship presumably resulting in automatic relegation.

Stadia and locations

League table

Topscorers

Bahraini Premier League seasons
1
Bah